Filonovskaya is a rural locality (a stanitsa) and the administrative center of Filonovskoye Rural Settlement, Novoanninsky District, Volgograd Oblast, Russia. The population was 1,227 as of 2010. There are 22 streets.

Geography 
Filonovskaya is located in forest steppe on the Khopyorsko-Buzulukskaya Plain, on the bank of the Buzuluk River, 14 km northeast of Novoanninsky (the district's administrative centre) by road. Budennovsky is the nearest rural locality.

References 

Rural localities in Novoanninsky District
Don Host Oblast